Blackstreet Capital Management, LLC is a private equity firm that invests in and operates small to mid-sized distressed companies. It was founded in 2002 in Chevy Chase, Maryland,  by Murry Gunty, who still acts as managing partner.

History
Blackstreet was founded by Gunty in 2002 as Milestone Capital Partners, in a joint venture with Milestone Merchant Partners. Robert Pincus, the vice chairman of Eagle Bank; and Thomas Hale Boggs, Jr., a prominent Washington lawyer, promptly joined Blackstreet’s board of advisers, providing the gravitas to attract investors.

Blackstreet invests in distressed companies, aiming to prevent the company’s bankruptcy and benefit investors. Blackstreet funds niche manufacturers, internet and specialty retailers, distributors, restaurants, and healthcare service and device providers, among other industries. 

As of 2015, Blackstreet had invested in more than 30 companies, mostly ones with less than $150 million in annual revenue. The company acquired AlphaGraphics, Jackson & Perkins, Western Capital, and Jerry's Subs & Pizza. It sold Florida Tile to Panariagroup of Italy, Houston Harvest Gift Products to Signature Brands, and PJCOMN Acquisition Corporation to Essential Pizza.

In 2016, Blackstreet and Gunty agreed to pay more than $3.1 million to the Securities and Exchange Commission to settle charges that they engaged in brokerage activity and charged fees without registering as a broker-dealer and committed other securities law violations.

Management
Gunty is the founder and managing partner of Blackstreet Capital. Gunty graduated from Harvard College, where he received a BA in economics, and Harvard Business School, where he received an MBA. Before founding Blackstreet, Gunty was a general partner at Jacobson Partners, LP, and was a partner at Lazard Freres Real Estate, LLC.  He also worked as an analyst for the Blackstone Group. 

Gunty has sat on several boards, including Rauch Industries, American Combustion Industries, Flow Dry Technology, PJCOMN, and Florida Tile.

References

External links

2002 establishments in Maryland
American companies established in 2002
Financial services companies established in 2002
Private equity firms of the United States
Financial services companies based in Maryland
Companies based in Chevy Chase, Maryland